In Jamaican Patois, batty boy (also Lew Page, batty man, and chi chi bwoy/man) is a slang expression often used to refer to a gay or effeminate man. The term batiman (or battyman) is also used in Belize owing to the popularity of Jamaican music there. The term derives from the Jamaican slang word batty, which refers to buttocks. It is a slur and considered offensive. 

Certain forms of Jamaican music feature both homophobic and extremely violent themes. One such example of this is the 1992 dancehall hit "Boom Bye Bye" by Buju Banton which contains lyrics that advocate the killing of gay men. The pejorative chi chi man forms the title of a T.O.K. song about killing gay men and setting them on fire; it was the Jamaican Labour Party's 2001 theme song. In the following year, the People's National Party similarly based their slogan "Log On to Progress" on Elephant Man's track "Log On" which likewise features some violent and homophobic lyrics (e.g. "step pon chi chi man", i.e. "stomp on a faggot").

Post-World War II Jamaican immigrants brought the term "batty boy" to the United Kingdom. British comedian Sacha Baron Cohen frequently used the expression in his Ali G character, including in a 2002 interview that led to an apology by the BBC for Cohen's foul language.

See also
 Stop Murder Music
 LGBT rights in Jamaica
 Batty Boy (Lil Nas X song)

References

Belizean culture
Effeminacy
English phrases
Homophobic slurs
Jamaican culture
Violence against gay men